Cryptinae is a subfamily of wasps in the family Ichneumonidae. The family has also been called Gelinae, Hemitelinae, and Phygadeuontinae by various authorities, though the Phygadeuontinae have since been elevated to a separate subfamily.

Description 
Species are distributed worldwide. A 5-sided areolet, a short sternaulus, and a puffy face with a convex clypeus are diagnostic characters for most members of this large subfamily.

Taxonomy 
Gelinae was the name used by H. K. Townes in 1969. Fitton and Gauld's review of ichneumonid families synonymized Gelinae under Hemitelinae in 1976 and later as Phygadeuontinae in 1978. However, due to the decision of International Code of Zoological Nomenclature's Opinion 1715 in 1994 to conserve the status of the genus Cryptus Fabricius, 1804, both Gelinae and Phygadeuontinae became junior synonyms for Cryptinae. Santos later restricted the family in 2017 to only include the tribes Aptesini and Cryptini, forming the separate families Claseinae and Phygadeuontinae for the remaining tribes of Claseini (1 genus) and Phygadeuontini (123 genera), respectively.

There are about 273 genera in Cryptinae between the tribes of Aptesini and Cryptini.

Classification 
The following classification of Phygadeuontini is based on Wahl (2014):

Tribe Cryptini

 Subtribe Agrothereutina
 Agrothereutes Förster, 1850  — Holarctic
 Amauromorpha Ashmead, 1905 — Oriental
 Apsilops Förster, 1869 — Holarctic
 Aritranis Förster, 1869 — Holarctic
 Gambrus Förster, 1869 — Holarctic
 Hidryta Förster, 1869 — Holarctic
 Idiolispa Förster, 1869 — Holarctic
 Mesostenidea Viereck, 1914 — Palearctic
 Pycnocryptodes Aubert, 1971 — Palearctic
 Pycnocryptus Thomson, 1873 — Holarctic
 Thrybius Townes, 1965 — Palearctic
 Trychosis Förster, 1869 — Holarctic, Oriental
 Subtribe Ateleutina
 Ateleute Förster, 1869 — worldwide
 Tamaulipeca Kasparyan & Hernandez, 2001 — Neotropical
 Subtribe Baryceratina
 Baryceros Gravenhorst, 1829 — Nearctic, Neotropical
 Brussinocryptus Pagliano & Scarramozino, 1990 — Oriental, Palearctic
 Buysmania Cheesman, 1941 — Oriental
 Calaminus Townes, 1965 — Palearctic
 Ceratomansa Cushman, 1922 — Australian
 Chlorocryptus Cameron, 1903 — Oriental, Palearctic
 Coccygodes Saussure, 1892 — Ethiopian
 Jonathania Gupta, 1987 — Oriental
 Lamprocryptidea Viereck, 1913 — Neotropical
 Paragambrus Uchida, 1936 — Palearctic
 Prionacis Townes, 1970a — Oriental
 Whymperia Cameron, 1903 — Nearctic, Neotropical
 Subtribe Ceratocryptina
 Acromia Townes, 1961b — Oriental
 Afretha Seyrig, 1952 — Ethiopian
 Aprix Townes, 1961b — Australian
 Ceratocryptus Cameron, 1903 — Ethiopian, Oriental
 Ceratodolius Seyrig, 1952 — Ethiopian
 Chamula Townes, 1962 — Nearctic, Neotropical
 Cheesmanella Ozdikmen, 2005 — Oriental
 Cremnocryptus Cushman, 1945 — Australian, Oriental
 Ecaepomia Wang, 2001 — Oriental
 Fitatsia Seyrig, 1952 — Ethiopian, Oriental
 Lipoprion Townes, 1970a — Oriental
 Lorio Cheesman, 1936 — Oriental
 Malaycromia Gupta, 1999 — Oriental
 Neaprix Gauld, 1984 — Australian
 Nematocryptus Roman, 1910 — Ethiopian, Oriental
 Piasites Seyrig, 1952 — Ethiopian
 Rambites Seyrig, 1952 — Ethiopian
 Silsila Cameron, 1903 — Oriental
 Thelodon Townes, 1961b — Australian, Oriental
 Trachyglutus Townes, 1970a — Neotropical
 Wuda Cheesman, 1936 — Oriental
 Subtribe Coesulina
 Coesula Cameron, 1905 — Oriental
 Subtribe Cryptina

 Aeglocryptus Porter, 1987 — Neotropical
 Aeliopotes Porter, 1985 — Neotropical
 Aglaodina Porter, 1987 — Neotropical
 Anacis Porter, 1967 — Australian, Neotropical
 Araucacis Porter, 1987 — Neotropical
 Biconus Townes, 1970a — Neotropical
 Buathra Cameron, 1903 — Holarctic, Oriental
 Caenocryptoides Uchida, 1936 — Oriental, Palearctic
 Caenocryptus Thomson, 1873 — Holarctic
 Caenopelte Porter, 1967 — Neotropical
 Camera Townes, 1962 — Nearctic, Neotropical
 Chilecryptus Porter, 1987 — Neotropical
 Chromocryptus Ashmead, 1900 — Neotropical
 Compsocryptus Ashmead, 1900 — Nearctic, Neotropical
 Cosmiocryptus Cameron, 1902 — Neotropical (Porter, 1987)
 Cryptopteryx Ashmead, 1900 — Neotropical
 Cryptus Fabricius, 1804 — Ethiopian, Holarctic, Oriental
 Cyanodolius Seyrig, 1952 — Ethiopian
 Cyanopelor Townes, 1973 — Ethiopian
 Cyclaulus Townes, 1970a — Neotropical
 Dihelus Townes, 1970a — Oriental, Palearctic
 Diplohimas Townes, 1970a — Neotropical
 Distictus Townes, 1966 — Neotropical
 Dochmidium Porter, 1967 — Neotropical (Porter, 1987)
 Dotocryptus Brèthes, (1918) 1919 — Neotropical
 Enclisis Townes, 1970a — Palearctic
 Etha Cameron, 1903 — Oriental
 Gessia Townes, 1973 — Ethiopian
 Glabridorsum Townes, 1970a — Australian, Oriental, Palearctic
 Gyropyga Townes, 1970a — Oriental, Palearctic
 Hedycryptus Cameron, 1903 — Oriental, Palearctic
 Hypsanacis Porter, 1987 — Neotropical
 Ischnus Gravenhorst, 1829 — worldwide
 Itamuton Porter, 1987 — Neotropical
 Joppidium Cresson, 1872 — Nearctic, Neotropical
 Lanugo Townes, 1962 — Nearctic, Neotropical
 Leptarthron Townes, 1970a — Neotropical
 Meringopus Förster, 1869 — Holarctic
 Mesophragis Seyrig, 1952 — Ethiopian
 Monothela Townes, 1970a — Neotropical
 Myrmecacis Porter, 1987 — Neotropical
 Myrmeleonostenus Uchida, 1936 — Australian, Oriental, Palearctic
 Nebostenus Gauld, 1984 — Australian
 Nelophia Porter, 1967 — Neotropical
 Neocryptopteryx Blanchard, 1947 — Neotropical (Porter, 1987)
 Neodontocryptus Uchida, 1940 — Oriental
 Nippocryptus Uchida, 1936 — Oriental, Palearctic
 Nothischnus Porter, 1967 — Neotropical (Porter, 1987)
 Odontocryptus Saussure, 1892 — Ethiopian
 Oecetiplex Porter, 1987 — Neotropica
 Palmerella Cameron, 1908 — Oriental, Palearctic
 Periplasma Porter, 1967 — Neotropical (Porter, 1987)
 Phycitiplex Porter, 1987 — Neotropical
 Picrocryptoides Porter, 1965 — Neotropical
 Reptatrix Townes, 1962 — Nearctic
 Rhynchocryptus Cameron, 1905 — Ethiopian (Townes & Townes, 1973)
 Sciocryptus Porter, 1987 — Neotropical
 Synechocryptus Schmiedeknecht, 1904 — Ethiopian, Palearctic
 Trachysphyrus Haliday, 1836 — Neotropical
 Tricentrum Townes, 1970a — Neotropical
 Trihapsis Townes, 1970a — Neotropical
 Xiphonychidion Porter, 1967 — Neotropical (Porter, 1987)
 Xylacis Porter, 1987 — Neotropical
 Xylophrurus Förster, 1869 — Holarctic
 Xylostenus Gauld, 1984 — Australian
 Zonocryptus Ashmead, 1900 — Ethiopian
 Subtribe Gabuniina

 Agonocryptus Cushman, 1929 — Nearctic, Neotropical
 Ahilya Gupta & Gupta, 1985 — Oriental
 Amrapalia Gupta & Jonathan, 1970 — Oriental
 Anepomias Seyrig, 1952 — Ethiopian
 Apocryptus Uchida, 1932 — Oriental
 Arhytis Townes, 1970a — Australian, Oriental
 Cestrus Townes, 1966 — Neotropical
 Cryptohelcostizus Cushman, 1919 — Nearctic
 Dagathia Cameron, 1903 — Oriental
 Digonocryptus Viereck, 1913 — Neotropical
 Eurycryptus Cameron, 1901 — Australian, Ethiopian, Oriental
 Fenixia Aguiar, 2005 — Neotropical
 Fortipalpa Kasparyan & Ruiz, 2007 — Neotropical
 Gabunia Kriechbaumer, 1895 — Ethiopian
 Gerdius Townes, 1970a — Ethiopian
 Hackerocryptus Gauld, 1984 — Australian
 Hadrocryptus Cameron, 1903 — Oriental
 Kemalia Koçak, 2009 — Oriental
 Kriegeria Ashmead, 1905 — Oriental (Gupta, 1987)
 Lagarosoma Gupta & Gupta, 1984 — Neotropical
 Lophoglutus Gauld, 1984 — Australian
 Microstenus Szépligeti, 1916 — Oriental
 Nesolinoceras Ashmead, 1906 — Neotropical
 Pharzites Cameron, 1905 — Oriental
 Prosthoporus Porter, 1976 — Neotropical
 Pterocryptus Szépligeti, 1916 — Ethiopian, Palearctic
 Schreineria Schreiner, 1905 — Ethiopian, Oriental, Palearctic
 Spathacantha Townes, 1970a — Ethiopian
 Tanepomidos Gupta & Jonathan, 1971 — Oriental
 Torbda Cameron, 1902 — Oriental
 Trypha Townes, 1970a — Neotropical
 Xanthocryptus Cameron, 1901 — Australian, Oriental
 Xoridesopus Cameron, 1907 — Oriental
 Subtribe Glodianina
 Dicamixus Szépligeti, 1916 — Neotropical
 Glodianus Cameron, 1902 — Neotropical
 Lamprocryptus Schmiedeknecht, 1904 — Neotropical
 Subtribe Goryphina
 Allophatnus Cameron, 1905 — Australian, Ethiopian, Oriental (Townes, 1971)
 Baltazaria Townes, 1961b — Neotropical, Oriental
 Bozakites Seyrig, 1952 — Ethiopian
 Buodias Cameron, 1902 — Ethiopian, Oriental (Gupta, 1987)
 Hoeocryptus Habermehl, 1902
 Takastenus Uchida, 1931 (Gauld, 1984 — Gupta, 1987)
 Soratsia Seyrig, 1952 (Townes & Townes, 1973)
 Ceratella Seyrig, 1952
 Calosphyrum Townes, 1970a — Oriental
 Ceratophenax Seyrig, 1952 — Ethiopian
 Colaulus Townes, 1970a — Oriental
 Costifrons Townes, 1970a — Ethiopian
 Debilos Townes, 1966 — Neotropical
 Diapetimorpha Viereck, 1913 — Nearctic, Neotropical
 Euchalinus Townes, 1961b — Australian, Oriental
 Formostenus Uchida, 1931 (Jonathan, 1980) — Oriental
 Fotsiforia Seyrig, 1952 — Ethiopian, Oriental (Jonathan, 1980)
 Friona Cameron, 1902 — Oriental
 Gambroides Betrem, 1941 — Australian, Ethiopian, Oriental (Jonathan, 1980)
 Goryphus Holmgren, 1868 — Australian, Ethiopian, Oriental
 Hemisphragia Seyrig, 1952 — Ethiopian
 Hoeocryptus Habermehl, 1902 — Ethiopian
 Hylophasma Townes, 1970a — Holarctic, Neotropical
 Isotima Förster, 1869 — Oriental, Ethiopian
 Larpelites Cameron, 1904 — Ethiopian
 Lavinifia Seyrig, 1952 — Ethiopian
 Listrognathus Tschek, 1870 — Australian, Ethiopian, Holarctic, Oriental
 Loxopus Townes, 1970a — Neotropical
 Madagascesa Kocak & Kemal, 2008 - formerly Perinetia Seyrig, 1952 — Ethiopian
 Madastenus Seyrig, 1952 — Ethiopian
 Melcha Cameron, 1902 — Oriental
 Menaforia Seyrig, 1952 — Ethiopian, Oriental
 Necolio Cheesman, 1936 — Australian, Ethiopian, Oriental, Palearctic
 Neobuodias Rao & Nikam, 1984 — Oriental
 Owenus Townes, 1970a — Ethiopian
 Perjiva Jonathan & Gupta, 1973 — Oriental
 Piambia Seyrig, 1952 — Ethiopian
 Pseudotricapus Jonathan, 1987 — Oriental
 Skeatia Cameron, 1901 — Ethiopian, Oriental (Jonathan & Gupta, 1973)
 Syntrips Gauld, 1984 — Australian
 Tanyloncha Townes, 1970a — Ethiopian
 Tolonus Seyrig, 1952 — Ethiopian
 Trafana Seyrig, 1952 — Ethiopian
 Tricapus Townes, 1970a — Ethiopian
 Tsirambia Seyrig, 1952 — Ethiopian
 Subtribe Lymeonina

 Acerastes Cushman, 1929 — Nearctic, Neotropical
 Basileucus Townes, 1970a — Neotropical
 Bathyzonus Townes, 1970a — Neotropical
 Bicryptella Strand, 1917 — Neotropical
 Dismodix Townes, 1966 — Neotropical
 Golbachiella Townes, 1970a — Neotropical
 Latosculum Townes, 1966 — Neotropical
 Lymeon Förster, 1869 — Nearctic, Neotropical
 Mallochia Viereck, 1912 — Nearctic, Neotropical
 Pachysomoides Strand, 1917 — Nearctic, Neotropical
 Petila Tedesco & Aguiar, 2009 — Neotropic
 Polycyrtidea Viereck, 1913 — Nearctic, Neotropical
 Polyphrix Townes, 1970a — Neotropical
 Priotomis Townes, 1970a — Neotropical
 Rhinium Townes, 1966 — Neotropical
 Savolia Seyrig, 1952 — Ethiopian
 Strabotes Townes, 1970a — Neotropical
 Toechorychus Townes, 1946 — Neotropical
 Subtribe Melanocryptina
 Melanocryptus Cameron, 1902 — Neotropical
 Subtribe Mesostenina

 Acorystus Townes, 1970a — Neotropical
 Anupama Jonathan, 1982 — Oriental
 Bicristella Townes, 1966 — Neotropical
 Cryptanura Brullé, 1846 — Nearctic, Neotropical
 Diloa Cheesman, 1936 — Australian, Oriental
 Gotra Cameron, 1902 — Ethiopian, Oriental
 Gyrolaba Townes, 1970a — Oriental
 Harpura Townes, 1970a — Neotropical
 Hercana Townes, 1970a — Neotropical
 Irabatha Cameron, 1906 — Australian, Oriental
 Junctivena Gauld, 1984 — Australian
 Mecistum Townes, 1970a — Neotropical
 Mesostenus Gravenhorst, 1829 — worldwide
 Paranacis Gauld, 1984 — Australian
 Polycyrtus Spinola, 1840 — Nearctic, Neotropical
 Stiromesostenuss Cameron, 1911 — Australian, Oriental
 Tomagotras Gauld, 1984 — Australian
 Tretobasis Porter, 1973 — Neotropical
 Subtribe Osprynchotina
 Acroricnus Ratzeburg, 1852 — Holarctic
 Iaria Cheesman, 1936 — Australian, Oriental
 Messataporus Cushman, 1929 — Nearctic, Neotropical
 Nematopodius Gravenhorst, 1829 — Oriental, Palearctic
 Osprynchotus Spinola, 1841 — Ethiopian
 Photocryptus Viereck, 1913 — Neotropical
 Poecilopimpla Morley, 1914;
 Picardiella Lichtenstein, 1920 — Ethiopian, Oriental, Palearctic
 Sphecoctonus Seyrig, 1952 — Ethiopian
 Stenarella Szépligeti, 1916 — Australian, Ethiopian, Oriental
 Subtribe Sphecophagina
 Arthula Cameron, 1900 — Australian, Oriental, Palearctic
 Latibulus Gistel, 1848 — Oriental, Palearctic
 Sphecophaga Westwood, 1840 — Holarctic
 Subtribe Vagenathina
 Stetholophus Townes, 1970a — Oriental
 Vagenatha Cameron, 1901 — Oriental

Tribe Aptesini

 Aconias Cameron, 1904 — Palearctic, Oriental
 Aptesis Förster, 1850 — Ethiopian, Holarctic, Oriental
 Colocnema Förster, 1869 — Palearctic
 Cratocryptus Thomson, 1873 — Holarctic
 Cubocephalus Ratzeburg, 1848 — Holarctic
 Demopheles Förster, 1869 — Holarctic, Oriental
 Echthrus Gravenhorst, 1829 — Holarctic
 Giraudia Förster, 1869 — Holarctic
 Hemigaster Brullé, 1846 — Oriental
 Javra Cameron, 1903 — Holarctic, Oriental
 Listrocryptus Brauns, 1905 — Palearctic
 Litochila Momoi, 1965 — Oriental, Palearctic
 Livipurpurata Wang & Yao, 1994 — Oriental
 Mansa Tosquinet, 1896 — Ethiopian, Oriental
 Megaplectes Förster, 1869 — Holarctic
 Notocampsis Townes, 1970a — Neotropical
 Oresbius Marshall, 1867 — Holarctic
 Oxytaenia Förster, 1869 — Nearctic, Neotropical
 Parmortha Townes, 1962 — Holarctic
 Platymystax Townes, 1970a — Ethiopian, Neotropical, Oriental
 Plectrocryptus Thomson, 1874 — Oriental, Palearctic
 Pleolophus Townes, 1962 — Holarctic
 Polytribax Förster, 1869 — Holarctic, Neotropical, Oriental
 Rhytura Townes, 1962 — Nearctic
 Schenkia Förster, 1869 — Holarctic
 Stomacis'' Townes, 1970a — Oriental

References

External links
Tribe Cryptini Images. The Ecology of Commanster.

 
Apocrita subfamilies